NK Konavljanin is a Croatian football club based in Čilipi.

Honours 

 Treća HNL – South:
Winners (1): 2004–05

Football clubs in Croatia
Football clubs in Dubrovnik-Neretva County
Association football clubs established in 1947
1947 establishments in Croatia